Éric Graham (born 7 August 1950) is a French former racing driver.

References

1950 births
Living people
French racing drivers
24 Hours of Le Mans drivers
Place of birth missing (living people)